Anthony DeVante Edwards (born August 5, 2001), nicknamed "Ant-Man", is an American professional basketball player for the Minnesota Timberwolves of the National Basketball Association (NBA). A shooting guard, he played college basketball for the Georgia Bulldogs.

Edwards finished his high school career at Holy Spirit Preparatory School in his hometown of Atlanta, where he was rated a consensus five-star recruit and one of the best players in the 2019 class by major recruiting services. As a senior, he earned McDonald's All-American and USA Today All-USA first team honors. He committed to play college basketball for Georgia, becoming the highest rated recruit to do so, and was named SEC Freshman of the Year after his freshman season with the team. He was selected with the first overall pick by the Minnesota Timberwolves in the 2020 NBA Draft.

Early life

Edwards spent his early life in Atlanta, Georgia. When he was three years old, he was given the nickname "Ant-Man" by his father. For much of his childhood, Edwards played football at the running back, quarterback, and cornerback positions. He played youth football for the Atlanta Vikings and became one of the best Pop Warner running backs in the country by age 10. However, Edwards switched his focus to basketball because he "thought it looked more fun" after watching his brothers play the sport. He often played basketball against his brothers at their grandmother's house. Entering ninth grade, he began training under the guidance of Justin Holland, a former college basketball player for Liberty and an Atlanta-based basketball trainer.

High school career
Due to his success with the Atlanta Xpress 15-under Amateur Athletic Union team, Edwards was considered a four-star recruit by Rivals in 2016. He began playing high school basketball for Therrell High School in Atlanta as a member of the 2019 class. In early January 2017, Edwards transferred to Holy Spirit Preparatory School in Atlanta and reclassified to the 2020 class. He made the move in an effort to improve his academic performance, since Holy Spirit Preparatory had "small class sizes and support to help that."

In March 2018, Edwards helped Holy Spirit Preparatory defeat The Heritage School for the Georgia Independent School Association (GISA) Class AAA state championship. He reclassified back to the 2019 class in November 2018 after seeing academic improvement. As a result, Edwards rose to become the number one recruit in the Top247 rankings by recruiting website 247Sports. In his senior season, his team finished as GISA Class AAA runners-up to The Heritage School, despite 27 points from Edwards. At the end of the season, he was averaging 29 points, nine rebounds, and two assists per game. Edwards garnered USA Today All-USA first team and MaxPreps All-American fourth team recognition. He played in the McDonald's All-American Game and Jordan Brand Classic in March and April 2019, respectively.

Recruiting
By consensus among major recruiting services 247Sports, ESPN, and Rivals, Edwards was rated a five-star recruit, top-five player, and the top shooting guard in the 2019 class. On February 11, 2019, he committed to play college basketball for Georgia, becoming the program's best recruit in the modern recruiting era. Edwards chose the Bulldogs over offers from Florida State, Kansas, Kentucky, and North Carolina. Edwards was drawn to Georgia because two of his favorite players, Dwyane Wade and Victor Oladipo, had been coached in college by head coach Tom Crean.

College career

On November 5, 2019, Edwards made his debut for the Georgia Bulldogs, recording 24 points, nine rebounds, and four steals in a 91–72 win over Western Carolina. It was the most points by a Georgia freshman debutant since Basketball Hall of Fame inductee Dominique Wilkins in 1979. On November 26, he scored a season-high 37 points, including 33 in the second half, and posted six rebounds, four steals, and three blocks in a 93–85 loss to third-ranked Michigan State at the Maui Invitational. Edwards became the first Georgia freshman to score at least 37 points in a game since Jacky Dorsey in 1975. In his final game at the tournament, he led all scorers with 24 points and made the game-winning shot against NCAA Division II team Chaminade.

On February 1, 2020, Edwards recorded 29 points and 15 rebounds, both game-highs, in a 63–48 victory over Texas A&M. In his next game, he led all scorers with 32 points in an 81–75 loss to Florida. On February 26, Edwards scored 36 points and collected seven rebounds, four assists and four steals, in a 94–90 overtime defeat of South Carolina. As a freshman, he averaged 19.1 points, 5.2 rebounds and 2.8 assists per game. Edwards was the top scorer on his team and among freshmen nationally. He earned second-team All-SEC and SEC Freshman of the Year honors. Edwards collected SEC Freshman of the Week accolades four times during the season, the most in program history. He was also one of five finalists for the Jerry West Award, which recognizes the top collegiate shooting guard.

On March 20, 2020, in the spring of his freshman year, Edwards declared for the 2020 NBA draft as one of the most touted prospects in his class. He signed with an agent, forgoing his remaining college basketball eligibility.

Professional career

Minnesota Timberwolves (2020–present)
The 2020 NBA draft was delayed by five months due to the COVID-19 pandemic.  In November 2020, Edwards was selected as the No. 1 overall pick by the Minnesota Timberwolves. On December 23, 2020, Edwards made his NBA debut, putting up 15 points, 4 rebounds, and 4 assists in 25 minutes, in a 111–101 win against the Detroit Pistons. On March 18, 2021, Edwards scored a then career-high 42 points, along with seven rebounds and three assists in a game against the Phoenix Suns becoming the third youngest player to score 40+ points in NBA history. After the season, Edwards finished second in Rookie of the Year voting and was named to the NBA All-Rookie First Team.

On November 10, 2021, Edwards scored a then career-high 48 points on seven three-pointers in a 123–110 loss to the Golden State Warriors. On December 15, 2021, Edwards  became just the seventh player in NBA history to score 2,000 points in his first 100 games at age 20 or younger, joining LeBron James, Carmelo Anthony, Kevin Durant, Kyrie Irving, Luka Dončić, and Zion Williamson. In the same game, Edwards also became the youngest player in NBA history with 10 three-pointers in a game, he also joined LeBron James, Blake Griffin and Luka Dončić as the fourth active player with at least 2,000 points, 400 rebounds and 300 assists in his first 100 career games. On January 25, 2022, in a 109–107 win over the Portland Trail Blazers, Edwards became the first player in NBA history to record a stat line of at least 40 points, nine rebounds, three blocks, three steals, and five three-pointers in a single game; he joined Anthony as the only players to score 40 points without an assist at 20 years old or younger. On April 7, 2022, Edwards scored a career-high 49 points in a 127–121 win over the San Antonio Spurs.

In Edwards' playoff debut on April 16, 2022, he logged 36 points and six assists in a 130–117 Game 1 win over the Memphis Grizzlies in the opening round of the 2022 NBA playoffs. Minnesota would go on to lose to Memphis despite Edwards' 30-point, 5-rebound, 5-assist, 2-steal and 2-block outing in the 114–106 close-out loss in Game 6.

On January 21, 2023, Edwards scored a season-high 44 points, including a season-high eight 3-pointers, along with six rebounds, four assists, three steals and three blocks in a 113–104 win over the Houston Rockets. Edwards was named an All-Star for the first time in his career as a reserve. He, alongside De'Aaron Fox and Pascal Siakam, were announced as injury replacements for injured stars Stephen Curry, Zion Williamson and Kevin Durant.

Career statistics

NBA

Regular season

|-
| style="text-align:left;"| 
| style="text-align:left;"| Minnesota
| style="background:#cfecec;"|  72* || 55 || 32.1 || .417 || .329 || .776 || 4.7 || 2.9 || 1.1 || .5 || 19.3
|-
| style="text-align:left;"| 
| style="text-align:left;"| Minnesota
| 72 || 72 || 34.3 || .441 || .357 || .786 || 4.8 || 3.8 || 1.5 || .6 || 21.3
|- class="sortbottom"
| style="text-align:center;" colspan="2"| Career
| 144 || 127 || 33.2 || .429 || .344 || .781 || 4.7 || 3.4 || 1.3 || .6 || 20.3
|- class="sortbottom"
| style="text-align:center;" colspan="2"| All-Star
| 1 || 0 || 17.1 || .750 || .000 || – || 4.0 || 1.0 || .0 || .0 || 12.0

Playoffs

|-
| style="text-align:left;"| 2022
| style="text-align:left;"| Minnesota
| 6 || 6 || 37.8 || .455 || .404 || .824 || 4.2 || 3.0 || 1.2 || 1.2 || 25.2
|- class="sortbottom"
| style="text-align:center;" colspan="2"| Career
| 6 || 6 || 37.8 || .455 || .404 || .824 || 4.2 || 3.0 || 1.2 || 1.2 || 25.2

College

|-
| style="text-align:left;"| 2019–20
| style="text-align:left;"| Georgia
| 32 || 32 || 33.0 || .402 || .294 || .772 || 5.2 || 2.8 || 1.3 || .6 || 19.1

Personal life
Edwards' mother, Yvette, and grandmother, Shirley, both died from cancer during an eight-month span in 2015, when he was in eighth grade. He has worn the  5 basketball jersey since high school to honor them, as they both died on the fifth day of the month. As a result, Edwards was raised by his sister, Antoinette, and brother, Antoine, who shared legal custody over him. In high school, Edwards frequently worked as an instructor at a number of youth camps. He intended to major in marketing while attending the University of Georgia.

During his childhood, Edwards also starred in baseball, often acting as his team's fourth or fifth hitter in the batting order. Edwards has also jokingly expressed how he was very skilled at a variety of sports when he was younger. He owns two dogs and has also expressed his affinity for lions, although he does not believe he has the requisite space to care for one.

Edwards made his acting debut in the 2022 sports drama film Hustle. His performance in the film as the main antagonist, Kermit Wilts, was praised by many, including the film’s producer and star Adam Sandler.

In September 2022, the NBA fined Edwards $40,000 for posting a video on September 10 in which he called a group of shirtless men "queer". The next day, he posted an apology, stating, "What I said was immature, hurtful, and disrespectful, and I'm incredibly sorry."

References

External links

Georgia Bulldogs bio
USA Basketball bio

2001 births
Living people
African-American basketball players
American men's basketball players
Basketball players from Atlanta
Georgia Bulldogs basketball players
McDonald's High School All-Americans
Minnesota Timberwolves draft picks
Minnesota Timberwolves players
Shooting guards
21st-century African-American sportspeople